Elizabeth O'Meara (born 19 October 1982) is a former association football player who represented New Zealand at international level.

O'Meara made a single appearance for the Football Ferns in a 9–0 win over Cook Islands on 9 April 2003.

References

External links

1982 births
Living people
New Zealand women's international footballers
New Zealand women's association footballers
Women's association football forwards